The III Tactical Air Command was a United States Army Air Forces formation. Its last assignment was with Third Air Force stationed at Barksdale Field, Louisiana. It was disbanded on 24 October 1945.  The command was established in 1941 as the 3rd Air Support Command.  It was responsible for training tactical units and aircrews for the Army Air Forces, except for the period from August 1943 through March 1944, when it specialized in training reconnaissance units.

History

Background
General Headquarters Air Force (GHQ AF) reorganized its four regional air districts as Numbered Air Forces in the spring of 1941.  By the fall of that year, each of these had organized as a support command and three combat commands.  In the summer of 1941 GHQ AF decided to establish commands to direct its air support mission in each numbered air force, plus one additional command reporting directly to GHQ AF.  3rd Air Force organized 3rd Air Support Command.  However, by early 1942, most of the command's trained personnel had moved overseas, leading GHQ AF to believe it had little more than the "remnants" of the command remaining.  As a result, it was decided to disband the command on 16 March 1942.

However, in May, the Army Air Forces (AAF) reaffirmed that each of the continental numbered air forces would have an air support command and the 3rd Air Force established a new 3rd Air Support Command at Birmingham Airport on 19 May.

Training tactical forces
The AAF determined that its continental air forces would specialize in their training operations and that all their air support commands would be reassigned to Third Air Force.  At various times, the III Tactical Air Command trained dive bombardment, light bombardment, and reconnaissance organizations and personnel; also gave air support to ground units in training and participated in air-ground maneuvers and demonstrations. In October of 1942, AAF directed that half of the observation groups assigned to the command were to be reduced to 50% strength or less with their personnel used to form new tow target squadrons, or transferred to heavy bomber Operational Training Unit (OTU)s or Replacement Training Unit (RTU)s.

In the summer of 1943, the Army Air Forces had begun to act to combine tactical and photographic reconnaissance functions, and in July, directed Third Air Force to establish a reconnaissance command that would train all tactical and photographic units and operate replacement training units for the personnel of those units.  As a result the command was redesignated III Reconnaissance Command and became the central training agency for reconnaissance units, with wings at Key Field and Will Rogers Field.

The command was disbanded in 1945. In 1947, when the United States Air Force (USAF) became independent, the Army transferred all Army Air Forces, Air Service and Air Corps units (there were a number of Air Corps units that had never been in the Army Air Forces, and a few Air Service units) to the USAF.

Lineage
 Constituted as the 3rd Ground Air Support Command on 15 May 1942
 Activated on 19 May 1942.
 Redesignated III Air Support Command c. 18 September 1942
 Redesignated III Reconnaissance Command  18 August 1943
 Redesignated III Tactical Air Command c. 10 March 1944
 Disbanded on 24 October 1945

Assignments 
 Third Air Force, 19 May 1942 – 24 October 1945

Components 
 Divisions
 I Tactical Air Division (later III Tactical Air Division, III Reconnaissance Command): c. 10 March 1944 – 1944
 II Tactical Air Division: c. 10 March 1944 – 24 October 1945
 III Tactical Air Division (later I Tactical Air Division): c. 10 March 1944 – 24 October 1945

 Wings
 22d Bombardment Training Wing: 5 December 1942 – 6 August 1943
 88th Reconnaissance Training Wing: 18 August – 20 December 1943 (thereafter disbanded).
 89th Reconnaissance Training Wing: 18 August 1943 – c. 1 April 1944 

 Groups

 8th Photographic Reconnaissance Group (later 8th Reconnaissance Group), 1 October–27 October 1943
 47th Bombardment Group, attached 29 June 1942, assigned 10 August – 27 September 1942
 48th Bombardment Group, 10 August 1942 – 6 August 1943
 67th Observation Group, 15 May – 23 June 1942; 4 July – 21 August 1942
 69th Reconnaissance Group (later 69th Tactical Reconnaissance Group), 6 August – 9 October 1943
 75th Observation Group (later 75th Reconnaissance Group, 75th Tactical Reconnaissance Group), c. 24 May 1942 – 18 April 1944
 77th Observation Group (later 77th Reconnaissance Group, 77th Tactical Reconnaissance Group), assigned 24 May – 21 August 1942; attached 7 September 1942 – 5 August 1943; assigned 6 August 1943 – 30 November 1943
 85th Bombardment Group, 10 August - 2 November 1942
 312th Bombardment Group, 10 August 1942 – 20 February 1943
 405th Bombardment Group (later 405th Fighter-Bomber Group), 1 March – 15 August 1943
 410th Bombardment Group, 1 July – 6 August 1943 (attached to 46th Bombardment Group)
 416th Bombardment Group, 5 February – 6 August 1943

 Squadrons

 1st Air Support Communications Squadron, c. 19 May – 3 November 1943 (attached to I Tactical Air Division after c. 8 September 1943)
 1st Reconnaissance Squadron (Special) (later 41st Photographic Reconnaissance Squadron): 1 October – 4 December 1944
 2nd Communications Squadron, Air Support: 31 May – 26 December 1942
 2d Composite Squadron (see 6th Reconnaissance Squadron)
 3d Composite Squadron (see 7th Reconnaissance Squadron)
 6th Photographic Technical Squadron: 1 December 1943 – 13 May 1944
 6th Reconnaissance Squadron (Special) (later 2d Composite Squadron): 20 August – 8 November 1943; 1 October 1944 – 25 October 1945
 7th Reconnaissance Squadron (Special) (later 3d Composite Squadron): 20 August – 8 November 1943; 1 October 1944 – 25 October 1945
 11th Communications Squadron, Air Support (later 11th Air Support Communications Squadron, 11th Air Support Control Squadron): 18 September 1942 – 11 December 1943
 13th Air Support Communications Squadron: 15 January – 7 June 1943
 14th Air Support Communications Squadron: 15 February – 3 March 1943
 15th Air Support Communications Squadron: 15 February – 23 August 1943
 18th Air Support Communications Squadron, 1 April – 3 November 1943
 20th Tactical Reconnaissance Squadron: 23 August – 26 December 1943
 24th Combat Mapping Squadron: 12 October – 26 December 1943
 27th Photographic Reconnaissance Squadron: 12 October – c. 4 November 1943
 28th Photographic Reconnaissance Squadron: 15 August – 27 September 1943
 30th Photographic Reconnaissance Squadron: 12 October 1943 – 4 February 1944
 31st Photographic Reconnaissance Squadron: 11 August 1943 – 31 March 1944
 32d Photographic Reconnaissance Squadron: 11 August 1943 – c. 20 April 1944
 33d Photographic Reconnaissance Squadron: 11 August 1943 – 1 May 1944
 34th Photographic Reconnaissance Squadron: 11 August – 9 October 1943
 35th Photographic Reconnaissance Squadron: 30 November 1943 – 5 May 1944
 40th Photographic Reconnaissance Squadron: 21 October 1943 – 18 April 1944
 41st Photographic Reconnaissance Squadron (see 1st Reconnaissance Squadron)
 106th Reconnaissance Squadron, 23 August – 19 November 1943
 118th Tactical Reconnaissance Squadron, c. 25 October 1943 – c. 16 February 1944
 158th Liaison Squadron, 1 October – 13 December 1944
 161st Liaison Squadron, 15 May – 24 June 1944; 1 September – 25 October 1945
 162nd Liaison Squadron, 1 September – 25 October 1945
 398th Fighter Squadron, 1 September – 25 October 1945 (attached to 372d Fighter Group after 2 October 1945)

Stations 
 Birmingham Airport (later Birmingham Army Air Base), Alabama, 19 May 1942
 Barksdale Field, Louisiana, c. 1 April 1944 – 24 October 1945

References

Notes
 Explanatory notes

 Citations

Bibliography

 
  
 
 
 

03
003